Angellie G. Urquico, better known by her stage name Anja Aguilar, is a Filipina actress and recording artist and Grand Winner of Little Big Star Season 2 in 2006. Former member of Pop Girls from VIVA Records.

Life and career
Aguilar hails from Marikina, where she was born as Angellie G. Urquico, by which name she was known when she won grand prize at ABS-CBN’s singing competition, Little Big Star, hosted by her idol Sarah Geronimo. As early as four years old, she already exemplified her singing talent at birthday parties and family gatherings. She has since joined over 50 contests which include Batang Vidaylin on ABC-5 (now The 5 Network) and Duet Bulilit on ABS-CBN’s then noontime show MTB.

After her breakthrough triumph in Little Big Star, acting opportunities also opened. She starred in an episode of Maalaala Mo Kaya, where she played a 12-year-old girl who fell in love with a 26-year-old guy, played by Piolo Pascual. She made a few drama series on ABS-CBN, such as Maria La Del Barrio, May Minamahal, and Palos. On film, she was seen in a minor role in Praybeyt Benjamin. She appeared in an indie film, Astig, starring Dennis Trillo, and another called Ugat Sa Lupa.

In 2009 Anja started a girl-group Pop Girls her screen name is Angellie Urquico in 2011 Anja left the group along with Shy Carlos and Nadine Lustre.

Anja signed up with Viva Artists Agency on May 15, 2010, and became a member of Pop Girls. The screen name "Anja Aguilar" came to be as a suggestion by VAA President Veronique R. Corpus. In January 2012, she was launched as one of ASAP 2012’s main talents. Her self-titled debut album was released in February.

The 10–track album "Anja Aguilar" has original compositions by the distinguished Vehnee Saturno, including the hit carrier single To Reach You.  She also made an outstanding cover of Willie Revillame’s song, I Love You, which was used by TV5’s drama series P.S. I Love You as its theme song. Director Monti Parungao, the same guy behind the music videos of Bakit Pa Ba by Sarah Geronimo and Masasabi Mo Ba by Rachelle Ann Go, and reputed for his exceptional work in commercials and reality shows like Survivor, also directed the video of To Reach You.

Album
Anja's album features songs such as "I Love You," and "When," and the Tagalog "Nasaan Ang Pangako".

TV Shows

Movies

References

Filipino women pop singers
Star Magic personalities
Living people
Reality show winners
Participants in Philippine reality television series
People from Marikina
Singers from Metro Manila
21st-century Filipino singers
21st-century Filipino women singers
Year of birth missing (living people)